The Golden Era is a 2014 Chinese-Hong Kong biographical drama film directed by Ann Hui, written and executive produced by Li Qiang and starring Tang Wei and Feng Shaofeng. Tang portrays Xiao Hong, while Feng plays Xiao Jun, two of the most important writers of 20th century China.  Other notable characters portrayed include Lu Xun (played by Wang Zhiwen), Duanmu Hongliang (played by Zhu Yawen) and Ding Ling (played by Hao Lei).

The movie was screened out of competition at the 71st Venice International Film Festival. It was selected as the Hong Kong entry for the Best Foreign Language Film at the 87th Academy Awards, but was not nominated. The movie won Best Film and Best Director	awards at the Hong Kong Film Awards.

Cast

 Tang Wei as Xiao Hong
 Feng Shaofeng as Xiao Jun
 Wang Zhiwen as Lu Xun
 Zhu Yawen as Duanmu Hongliang
 Huang Xuan
 Hao Lei as Ding Ling
 Yuan Quan as Mei Zhi
 Tian Yuan
 Ding Jiali
 Wang Qianyuan
 Zhang Luyi
 Sha Yi
 Zu Feng
 Zhang Yi
 Feng Lei
 Yuan Wenkang
 Chen Yuemo
 Wang Ziyi
 Zhang Jiayi
 Wang Jingchun
 Yang Xue
 Jiao Gang
 Zhang Bo
 Zhang Yao
 Ke Lan
 Tang Yixin
 Wang Kai

Production

Development

The idea for the film dates back to 2004, when Ann Hui and Chinese screenwriter Li Qiang discussed their interest in penning a story involving early 20th Century writers Xiao Hong (the pseudonym for Zhang Naiying) and Ding Ling. Research made by Hui and Qiang raised concerns over the possible censorship from the government because of Ding Ling’s open criticism of the Communist Party throughout her life. In 2007, Hui and Qiang decided to focus on Xiao Hong, after a suggestion from Beijing production company Cheerland Films, whose first project was Hui’s The Postmodern Life of My Aunt.

Although initially uninterested in Xiao Hong’s work when she read them in the 1970s, Hui later reread her novels as part of better understanding the literary writer. Hui found it difficult to research Hong’s own life due to the mystery that parts of her life were shrouded in, but remarked that the resulting screenplay for the film is “as close to the truth as we can get”.

Filming
The Golden Era production cost ¥70 million and lasted five months, during which shooting took place on location in Harbin, Wuhan, and Shanghai. Ann Hui would later describe the process of filming The Golden Era as making her “tense and nervous”, and playfully considered directing a comedy for her next film.
In addition to dramatizations, The Golden Era incorporates fictional narration, breaking the fourth wall, and faux-documentary interviews throughout the film, an unorthodox structure that gives it elements of experimental cinema.

Release
The Golden Era made its world premiere on September 6, 2014 at the 71st Venice International Film Festival, where it was shown out-of-competition and selected as the festival's closing film. Hui's previous full-length directorial feature, A Simple Life, also premiered at the Venice Film Festival in 2011, where it competed for the Golden Lion. Shortly after its world premiere, The Golden Era made its North American premiere at the 2014 Toronto International Film Festival, placed under the Masters category and distributed by China Lion Film Distribution Inc. The film continued to appear in other festivals, including the 27th Tokyo International Film Festival while making its first public release on October 1, 2014 in China.

On October 17, 2014, The Golden Era was released in the U.S. in a limited run that comprised just 15 theaters over a span of 6 weeks.

Home Media

Edko Films Ltd. (安樂影片) released The Golden Era on Blu-ray under Region A coding on January 28, 2015. This physical release includes an interactive photo gallery and a making-of featurette.

Reception

Box office

The film had earned ¥51.49 million at the Chinese box office. In its limited US release, The Golden Era earned $102,931 in 15 theaters.

Critical reception

The Golden Era received mixed to positive reviews. Most reviews praised Ann Hui's direction and insightfulness into Xiao Hong's life, but criticized its running time and the loosely structured narrative. As of June 16, 2015, Rotten Tomatoes has given the film a 63% rating compiled from 5 positive and 3 negative reviews. The average score from those reviews is 6/10.

Marcus Goh of Yahoo! Movies Singapore praised the film for its depiction of Xiao Hong, calling The Golden Era a "powerful coming-of-age story". Easternkicks.com's Andrew Heskins found that, though at times "overwhelming", complimented Ann Hui for "seeking to push her methods and styles of storytelling". Boston Herald's James Verniere applauded the film for its "epic telling" of Xiao Hong. In contrast, Daniel M. Gold of The New York Times disliked the film's focus on the negative events of Hong's life, elaborating how this "unintentionally reduces her to a cliché — the starving young artist, done wrong by men — she surely would have rejected."

The editing and experimental nature of The Golden Era was commented on by critics. South China Morning Post's Yvonne Teh found its 179-minute running time and use of different filmmaking elements resulted in an "emotional distant" movie, simultaneously criticizing Tang Wei's portrayal of Xiao Hong. With regards to its nonlinear narrative, Evelyn Kok of HK Magazine summated: "You can’t deny its masterful craft and intent, but it’s a portrait of a woman with her features all twisted and jumbled up."

Montreal Gazette's Liz Ferguson found the film informative and applauded its visual aesthetics, but described how Chinese viewers familiar with Xiao Hong's life are more likely to enjoy the film and can "fill in the blanks so much better" than Western viewers.

Awards and nominations

See also
 List of submissions to the 87th Academy Awards for Best Foreign Language Film
 List of Hong Kong submissions for the Academy Award for Best Foreign Language Film

References

External links
 

2014 films
2014 biographical drama films
Chinese biographical drama films
Hong Kong biographical drama films
Films set in Shanghai
Films shot in Shanghai
Films directed by Ann Hui
Films with screenplays by Li Qiang
2014 drama films
Xiao Hong